The Grammy Award for Best Regional Mexican Music Album (including Tejano) is an award presented at the Grammy Awards, a ceremony that was established in 1958 and originally called the Gramophone Awards, to recording artists for releasing albums in the regional Mexican or Tejano genres. Honors in several categories are presented at the ceremony annually by the National Academy of Recording Arts and Sciences of the United States to "honor artistic achievement, technical proficiency and overall excellence in the recording industry, without regard to album sales or chart position".

In 2012, the award - then known as "Best Regional Mexican or Tejano Album" - was one of the new categories that resulted from the Recording Academy's wish to decrease the list of categories and awards for that year. According to the Academy, "it was determined that musical distinctions among some of the regional Mexican subgenres were often very difficult to draw, so the restructuring in categories was warranted". This award combined the previous categories for Best Regional Mexican Album and Best Tejano Album. Other Latin categories were also either merged or discontinued.

Further restructuring took place in 2012 and was implemented in the 2013 Grammy Award season. As of 2013, this category was merged with the Best Banda or Norteño Album category which had been created in 2012. According to the Academy, "Best Banda or Norteño Album and Best Regional Mexican or Tejano Album are now merged into one category: "Best Regional Mexican Music Album (including Tejano)", for albums containing at least 51 percent playing time of new vocal or instrumental regional Mexican (banda, norteño, corridos, gruperos, mariachi, ranchera, and Tejano) recordings." As a result, this category is now named Best Regional Mexican Music Album (including Tejano).

As of the 2022, Mexican singer Vicente Fernandez holds the record for the most wins in this category, with three, including the one received posthumously at the 64th Grammy Award ceremony. Mariachi Divas de Cindy Shea holds the record for the most nominations, with six (one of which went on to be awarded with a Grammy). Mexican band Banda el Recodo is the most nominated act without a win, with three unsuccessful nominations.

Recipients

See also

Grammy Award for Best Banda or Norteño Album
Grammy Award for Best Latin Pop, Rock or Urban Album
Grammy Award for Best Tropical Latin Album

References

External links 
 Official Site of the Grammy Awards

 
Regional Mexican Or Tejano Album
Awards established in 2012
Album awards